A dust storm is a meteorological phenomenon in which strong winds move loose sand and dirt.

Dust Storm or Duststorm may also refer to:

 Dust Storm (Manter, Kansas), a work of art by John Gerrard
 Dust Storm (Transformers), a female Decepticon in the Transformers franchise
 The Dust Storm, a 2015 film
 Dust Storm, dam of the American Thoroughbred race horse Dust Commander
 Dust storm warning, as issued by the United States National Weather Service
 "Dust Storm", song by Third Eye Blind from Our Bande Apart, 2021